Peter Mahon  was an Irish Anglican priest.

Browne was educated at Trinity College, Dublin. He held livings at Killuken and Tumna. He was appointed Archdeacon of Elphin in 1683 and Dean in 1700. He died in 1739.

References 

Archdeacons of Elphin
Deans of Elphin
17th-century Irish Anglican priests
18th-century Irish Anglican priests
1739 deaths